Iorwerth mab Owain Gwynedd (or Iorwerth Drwyndwn meaning "the flat-nosed"), (c. 1130–1174), was the eldest legitimate son of Owain Gwynedd (the king of Gwynedd) and his first wife Gwladys (Gladys) ferch Llywarch. He married Marared ferch Madog. His son, Llywelyn the Great, eventually united the realm and became known as Llywelyn Fawr and is one of Wales's most famous monarchs. Iorwerth received Nant Conwy as his inheritance from his father, Owain Gwynedd. However, he did not receive the crown succession, as was the normal tradition, because of his nose defect (his sobriquet 'Trwyndwn' means broken-nosed).

Citations

Sources 

1130 births
1174 deaths
Year of birth uncertain
Welsh royalty
Medieval Welsh killed in battle
Welsh people of Irish descent
12th-century Welsh people
House of Aberffraw